The Lebanon Women's Cup, commonly known as the Lebanese Women's FA Cup, is the top cup competition for women's football clubs in Lebanon – designed as an equivalent to the Lebanese FA Cup. The competition began in 2008 with six entrants.

List of finals

Performance by club

See also 
 Women's football in Lebanon
 Lebanese Women's Football League
 Lebanese Women's Super Cup
 Lebanese FA Cup

References 

 
Lebanon
Women's football competitions in Lebanon
Recurring sporting events established in 2008
2008 establishments in Lebanon